Lotobia is a genus of flies belonging to the family Lesser Dung flies.

Species
L. africana (Becker, 1907)
L. alpina Kim & Han, 1990
L. arcuata (Séguy, 1933)
L. asiatica Hayashi & Papp, 2004
L. dolabrata Kim & Han, 1990
L. dura Vanschuytbroeck, 1959
L. elegans Vanschuytbroeck, 1959
L. endrodyi Papp, 1978
L. eritima Kim & Han, 1990
L. flavofemorata Kim & Han, 1990
L. halidayi Kim & Han, 1990
L. kivuensis Vanschuytbroeck, 1948
L. kovacsi Papp, 1978
L. latipes Hayashi & Papp, 2004
L. moyoensis Vanschuytbroeck, 1959
L. nigeriana Han & Kim, 1996
L. nigra Kim & Han, 1990
L. pallidiventris (Meigen, 1830)
L. saegeri Kim & Han, 1990
L. simia (Séguy, 1933)
L. similiter Vanschuytbroeck, 1959
L. southafricana Han & Kim, 1996
L. supraelegans Hayashi & Papp, 2004
L. temboensis Vanschuytbroeck, 1959
L. turbatrix Kim & Han, 1990
L. upembaensis Vanschuytbroeck, 1959
L. wittei Kim & Han, 1990

References

Sphaeroceridae
Diptera of Africa
Diptera of Europe
Diptera of North America
Brachycera genera